The Chilchalphorn is a mountain of the Lepontine Alps, overlooking Hinterrhein in the canton of Graubünden. On the northern side of the mountain lies a glacier named Fanellgletscher.

References

External links
 Chilchalphorn on Hikr

Mountains of the Alps
Alpine three-thousanders
Mountains of Switzerland
Mountains of Graubünden
Lepontine Alps
Vals, Switzerland
Rheinwald